Daniel Bevilacqua (13 October 1945 – 16 April 2020), better known by the stage name Christophe, was a French singer and songwriter. He was born in the Paris suburb of Juvisy-sur-Orge, to an Italian father.

Career
Born in a suburb of Paris, Bevilacqua was rebellious at school and started leading a pop group when in his mid-teens.  His first single, "Reviens Sophie" in 1963, was unsuccessful, but after changing his name to Christophe, his second single, "Aline", in 1965, rose to the top of the French pop music charts.  

He continued to have success in France through the 1960s and early 1970s. His hits include the songs "Marionettes", "J'ai entendu la mer", "Excusez-moi Monsieur le Professeur", and "Oh!... Mon Amour" which he sang in French and Italian. After a small break, he returned in 1971, with Francis Dreyfus launching the Motors record label (Disques Motors) and becoming the producer of Christophe records. The result was the 1973 album Les Paradis perdus. In 1974, he recorded "Les mots bleus", with lyrics by Jean-Michel Jarre.

In 1978, he came back with "Le Beau Bizarre". In 1983, Christophe released another single, "Succès fou", followed by "Clichés d'amour" in 1984 in which he sang 1940s and 1950s classics such as "Arrivederci Roma" and "Dernier baiser", a French version of the Mexican classic "Besame mucho". In 1985, he wrote "Ne raccroche pas" a song which is believed to be about the Princess Stephanie of Monaco. The following year, he wrote the song "Boule de flipper" for Corynne Charby.

In 1996, after a break, he returned with his album Bevilacqua. In 2001, he released another album Comm' si la terre penchait. In February 2002, Christophe performed, in Clermont-Ferrand, his first live concert in more than two decades, followed by two appearances at the Olympia in March 2002.

Christophe's 1970s song "Les mots bleus" was covered by Thierry Amiel in 2003. In 2011, Christophe took part in a tribute album for Alain Bashung two years after the latter's death. He sang "Alcaline", a song written by Bashung in 1989 for his album Novice.

In 2016, Christophe collaborated with Jean-Michel Jarre on the album "Electronica 2: The Heart of Noise" with the song "Walking The Mile".

Personal life
In 1971, Christophe married his girlfriend Véronique and fathered his daughter Lucie.

He died after being in critical condition due to COVID-19 associated with a previous comorbidity (COPD) on 16 April 2020.

Discography

Studio albums
 Christophe (1965, Disc'AZ)
 Sur la route de Salina (1970, Motors)
 Christophe (1972, Motors)
 Les paradis perdus (1973, Motors)
 Les mots bleus (1974, Motors)
 Samouraï (1976, Motors)
 La Dolce Vita (1977, Motors)
 Le Beau Bizarre (1978, Motors)
 Pas vu, pas pris (1980, Motors)
 Clichés d'amour (1983, Motors)
 Bevilacqua (1996, Epic)
 Comm'si la terre penchait (2001, Mercury)
 Aimer ce que nous sommes (2008, Az)
 Paradis retrouvé (2013, Motors)
 Les Vestiges du chaos (2016, Universal)

Live albums
 Olympia (1975, Motors)
 Olympia 2002 (2002, Mercury)
 Intime (2014, Motors) (either single CD or triple CD as deluxe ed.)

Compilations

 Mon Univers (1996, Motors) 1965-1988
 Best Of (2002, Dreyfus) 1965-1988
 Best Of (2006, Dreyfus) 1965-1988
 Christophe etc. (2019)
 Christophe etc. Vol. 2 (2019)
 Ultime. (2020)

Soundtracks
 La route de Salina (Motors)

Singles
1964: Reviens Sophie / Cette fureur de vivre / Ça n'fait rien / Se dire adieu
1965: Aline Aline / Je l'ai retrouvée / Je ne t'aime plus / La fille aux yeux bleus
1965: Les Marionnettes / Je suis parti / Tu n'es plus comme avant / Noël
1966: Je chante pour un ami / Cette vie là / La danse a trois temps / J'ai remarché
1966: Excusez-moi monsieur le professeur / La camargue / Pour un oui / Christina
1966: J'ai entendu la mer / Cette musique / Le spectacle / Tu es folle
1966: À ceux qu'on aime / Avec des mots d'amour / Maman / Les amoureux qui passent
1967: Je sais que c'est l'été / Le coup de fouet / Les espagnols / La petite gamine
1968: Amour interdit / Passons une nuit blanche / Confession / Si tu veux, je peux
with Motors label
1970: The Girl From Salina / Sunny Road To Salina
1971: La petite fille du 3e / Mere, tu es la seule
1971: Mal / Épouvantail
1971: Mes passagères / Fait chaud ce soir
1972: Oh mon amour / Goodbye, je reviendrai
1972: Main dans la main / Nue comme la mer
1973: La vie c'est une histoire d'amour / Les jours où rien ne va
1973: Belle / Rock monsieur
1973: Les paradis perdus / Mama
1973: Mickey / Emporte-moi
1973: L'amour toujours l'amour / La bête
1974: Señorita / Le temps de vivre
1974: Les mots bleus / Le dernier des Bevilacqua
1975: Petite fille du soleil / Le petit gars
1976: Merci John d'être venu / Paumé
1976: Une autre vie / Paumé
1976: Daisy / Macadam
1977: La Dolce Vita / La mélodie
1978: Un peu menteur / Ce mec-lou
1979: Aline / Je ne t'aime plus
1980: L'Italie / Question ambiance
1980: Agitation / Les tabourets du bar
1983: Succès Fou / Cœur défiguré
1983: Mon amie la jalousie / Souvenir de Laura
1983: Dernier baiser / La nuit bleue'
1984: J'l'ai pas touchée / Voix sans issue
1985: Ne raccroche pas / Méchamment rock'n'roll
1988: Chiqué chiqué / Un tour d'Harley avec Lucy
1988: Chiqué chiqué (long version) / Besame mucho / Ne raccroche pas (long version)

Filmography
1998: Autour de Vega, documentary by Hugues Peyret - as himself with Alan Vega
2006: Quand j'étais chanteur by Xavier Giannoli - as himself with Gérard Depardieu
2011: Preciosa short film by Dominique Abel - as Christophe
2013: Déjeuner chez Gertrude Stein, short by Isabelle Prim 
2014: Juke-Box9 short by Ilan Klipper - as Daniel Berton
2014: Le Quepa sur la vilni! film by Yann Le Quellec - as mayor of Noère

References

External links

 
 Biography of Christophe
 

1945 births
2020 deaths
French male singers
French people of Italian descent
Chevaliers of the Légion d'honneur
Commandeurs of the Ordre des Arts et des Lettres
People from Juvisy-sur-Orge
Burials at Montparnasse Cemetery
French male singer-songwriters
French singer-songwriters
French pop musicians
Respiratory disease deaths in France
Deaths from the COVID-19 pandemic in France
Deaths from chronic obstructive pulmonary disease
French pop singers